Honing is a kind of metalworking.

Hone may also refer to:

 Hone (name) (incl. Hōne), a list of people with the surname, given name or nickname
 Hõne language, spoken in Gombe State and Taraba State, Nigeria
 Hône, Italy